Donald M. "Bubba" Cathy (born 1953/1954) is an American billionaire businessman, EVP,
Chairman, STC Brands & Chick-fil-A  Ambassador of the fast-food chain Chick-fil-A, founded by his father, the late S. Truett Cathy. He is president of the related restaurant line Dwarf House.

Early life
Donald Cathy is the younger brother of Dan T. Cathy. Donald Cathy earned his bachelor's degree in marketing from Samford University.

Career
Prior to college, Cathy operated the Chick-fil-A in Morrow, Georgia's Southlake Mall. In 1995, he was officially named as senior vice president of Chick-fil-A, Inc. In the early 21st century, he serves as executive vice president and president of the company's Georgia-based Dwarf House and Truett's Grill restaurant concepts.

Personal life
Donald Cathy and his wife, Cindy, have six children and six grandchildren.

References

External links
 Cathy Family website

American billionaires
Cathy family
Chick-fil-A
Living people
Samford University alumni
Year of birth missing (living people)
1950s births